The Gow School is a college-prep boarding and day school for students, grades 6–12, with dyslexia and similar language-based learning disabilities. Other diagnoses include developmental coordination disorder, auditory processing disorder, dyscalculia, dysgraphia, and disorder of written expression. Students may also have attention (ADD or ADHD) or executive function difficulties. Located in South Wales, New York, near Buffalo, New York, United States the school was founded in 1926 by educator Peter Gow, along with insight from his colleague, neurologist Dr. Samuel T. Orton.

In 2020, former students came forward with allegations of sexual miscondut in the late 80's early 90's.

History

The Gow School has its roots in the early teaching experience of founder Peter Gow Jr., who as an instructor at Choate Rosemary Hall, Nichols School, and The Park School of Buffalo had become interested in the plight of students who, though clearly intellectually able, struggled with certain aspects of learning in the language domain, especially spelling and reading. After contacting Dr. Samuel T. Orton, a noted New York physician who had done pioneering work in the area of dyslexia, Gow began development of the Reconstructive Language methodology that has been the backbone of the Gow School program since its founding. 

Bradley Rogers announced his resignation for the year of 2023. 
In June of 2022, John Munro was named as the next Head of School elect. Mr. Munro is set to start on July 1, 2023

Notable alumni

Brooks McCabe 1966, West Virginia State Senator
Quinn Bradlee 2002, learning disabilities advocate

References

External links
The Gow School

Boarding schools in New York (state)
Educational institutions established in 1926
Learning disabilities
Private high schools in New York (state)
Private middle schools in New York (state)
Special schools in the United States
Therapeutic boarding schools in the United States
1926 establishments in New York (state)